is a special ward in Tokyo, Japan. The English translation of its Japanese self-designation is Meguro City. The ward was founded on March 15, 1947.

Meguro is predominantly residential in character, but is also home to light industry, corporate head offices, the Komaba campus of University of Tokyo as well as fifteen foreign embassies and consulates. Residential neighborhoods include, Jiyugaoka, Kakinokizaka, and Nakameguro. As of May 1, 2015, the ward has an estimated population of 277,171 and a population density of 18,890 persons per km2. The total area is 14.67 km2.

Meguro is also used to refer to the area around Meguro Station, which is not located in Meguro ward, but in neighboring Shinagawa's Kamiōsaki district.

History 
The Higashiyama shell mound in the north of the ward contains remains from the paleolithic, Jōmon, Yayoi, and Kofun periods.

The area now known as Meguro was formerly two towns, Meguro proper and Hibusuma, all parts of the former Ebara District of Musashi Province. The two were merged into a Meguro ward for Tokyo City in 1932 and since then the ward has remained with no alterations to its territory.

The name "Meguro", meaning "black eyes", derives from the Meguro Fudō (Black-eyed Fudō-myōō) of Ryūsenji. The Meguro Fudō was one of five Fudō-myōō statues placed at strategic points on the outskirts of Edo in the early seventeenth century by the abbot Tenkai, an advisor to Tokugawa Ieyasu, to provide protection for the new capital of the Tokugawa shogunate. Each statue had eyes of a different color. (Mejiro, a district in Toshima ward, is named for the white-eyed Fudō-myōō).

Geography 

Four other special wards surround Meguro. They are Shibuya (to the northeast), Setagaya (to the west), Ōta (to the south), and Shinagawa (to the southeast).

Districts and neighborhoods 

Hibusuma Area
 Chūōchō
 Haramachi
 Higashigaoka
 Himonya
 Jiyūgaoka
 Kakinokizaka
 Megurohonchō
 Midorigaoka
 Minami
 Nakane
 Ōokayama
 Senzoku
 Tairamachi
 Takaban
 Yakumo
 Hirachō

Meguro Area
 Aobadai
 Gohongi
 Higashiyama
 Kamimeguro
 Komaba
 Meguro
 Mita
 Nakachō
 Nakameguro
 Ōhashi
 Shimomeguro
 Yūtenji
 Sanda

Politics and government 

Meguro ward government is led by the city assembly with 36 elected members with current terms from May 1, 2011 to April 30, 2015. The chairman of the council is Yoshiaki Ito. The mayor is Eiji Aoki, an independent. His term lasts until April 24, 2016.

Elections 
 2007 Meguro local election
 2008 Meguro mayoral election

Sightseeing and local landmarks

Green spaces 
 Meguro River
 Komaba Park, Komaba
 Komabano Park, Komaba
 Komazawa Olympic Park
 Meguro Sky Garden, Ohashi Linear roof garden park spiraling 35 meters above street level covering the junction of two major expressways.
 Saigoyama Park, Aobadai
 Sugekari Park, Aobadai
 Nakameguro Park and Nature Center
 Himonya Park, Himonya

Cultural institutions 
 Tokyo Metropolitan Museum of Photography
 Meguro Museum of Art, Tokyo
 Meguro Persimmon Hall, concert and performance arts venue
 Meguro Parasitological Museum
 Japanese Folk Crafts Museum
 Chosenin Temple Contemporary Sculpture Museum
Meguro Gajoen, a landmark historic hotel

Religious institutions 
 Himonya Catholic Church
 St. Michael's Catholic Church (German Language)
 Himonya Hachiman Shrine
 Ōtori Shrine
 Ryūsenji (Meguro Fudo temple)
 Yūten-ji Temple
 St. Paul's Church, Gohongi (Anglican Church in Japan)
 Masjid Indonesia Tokyo

Transportation

Rail 
Tokyu Corporation
Tōyoko Line: Naka-Meguro, Yutenji, Gakugei Daigaku, Toritsu Daigaku, Jiyugaoka Stations
Ōimachi Line: Jiyugaoka, Midorigaoka, Ōokayama Stations
Meguro Line: Ōokayama, Senzoku Stations
Den-en-toshi Line: Ikejiri-Ōhashi Station
Keio Corporation Keiō Inokashira Line: Komaba-Todaimae Station
Note: Meguro Station (JR East, Tokyu Meguro Line, Tokyo Metro Namboku Line, Toei Mita Line) is in Shinagawa, not Meguro.

Highways 
Route 3 (Shuto Expressway) Shibuya radial route (Tanimachi JCT – Yoga)
Central Circular Route C2. Completed in 2016 this deep level subterranean expressway connect the Yamate Tunnel as far as the Bayshore Route in Shinagawa

Education

Colleges and universities 
 University of Tokyo Komaba Campus
 Tokyo Institute of Technology
 Note: Tokyo Gakugei University and Tokyo Metropolitan University were formerly in Meguro.

Public schools 
Metropolitan high schools are operated by the Tokyo Metropolitan Government Board of Education.
  (Kokusai means "International" in Japanese)
 Komaba High School
 Meguro High School
Geijutsu High School (Closed in 2012)

In addition the metropolis operates a consolidated junior and senior high school in Meguro called Ōshūkan Secondary School.

Municipal elementary and junior high schools are operated by the Meguro City Board of Education. 

Municipal junior high schools:
 Meguro 1st Junior High School (第一中学校)
 Meguro 7th Junior High School (第七中学校)
 Meguro 8th Junior High School (第八中学校)
 Meguro 9th Junior High School (第九中学校)
 Meguro 10th Junior High School (第十中学校)
 Meguro 11th Junior High School (第十一中学校)
 Higashiyama Junior High School (東山中学校)
 Meguro Chuo Junior High School (目黒中央中学校)
 Otori Junior High School (大鳥中学校)

Municipal elementary schools:
 Aburamen Elementary School (油面小学校)
 Dendo Elementary School (田道小学校)
 Fudo Elementary School (不動小学校)
 Gekkohara Elementary School (月光原小学校)
 Gohongi Elementary School (五本木小学校)
 Haramachi Elementary School (原町小学校)
 Higashine Elementary School (東根小学校)
 Higashiyama Elementary School (東山小学校)
 Ishibumi Elementary School (碑小学校)
 Kamimeguro Elementary School (上目黒小学校)
 Karasumori Elementary School (烏森小学校)
 Komaba Elementary School (駒場小学校)
 Midorigaoka Elementary School (緑ケ丘小学校)
 Miyamae Elementary School (宮前小学校)
 Mukaihara Elementary School (向原小学校)
 Naka Meguro Elementary School (中目黒小学校)
 Nakane Elementary School (中根小学校)
 Ookayama Elementary School (大岡山小学校)
 Shimomeguro Elementary School (下目黒小学校)
 Sugekari Elementary School (菅刈小学校)
 Takaban Elementary School (鷹番小学校)
 Yakumo Elementary School (八雲小学校)

International schools 
 Aoba-Japan International School

Economy

Company headquarters 
 Amazon Japan head office
 Books Kinokuniya
 Don Quijote discount store chain head office
 LDH (Headquarters for EXILE & other Dance Units)
 Makino
 New Japan Pro-Wrestling head office
 Ribera Steakhouse
 Stanley Electric
 TopTour Corporation
 Unilever Japan, head office
 Walt Disney Japan, head office

Notable people from Meguro 

Yumiko Fujita, actress
Waka Inoue, model, actress
Risa Tsubaki, voice actress
Toru Iwatani, arcade game designer, most notable for Pac-Man and Pole Position
Shigeru Izumiya, folk singer, entertainer (born in Aomori, Aomori, but raised in Meguro)
Masako, Empress of Japan (born in Toranomon, but raised in Meguro)
Yukio Sakaguchi, mixed martial arts fighter and professional wrestler
Kazuo Tokumitsu, television presenter

Notable residents 
Takuya Kimura, singer and actor in male idol group SMAP
Shizuka Kudo, popular singer and wife of Takuya Kimura (Originally from Hamura, Tokyo)
Keisuke Kuwata, singer with Southern All Stars (Originally from Chigasaki, Kanagawa)
Nobuyo Ōyama, voices the anime character Doraemon (Originally from Shibuya, Tokyo)
Miyu Uehara, gravure idol, found dead in her Meguro apartment (Originally from Tanegashima, Kagoshima)
Halca & Yucali of the hip-hop duo Halcali
Shori Sato, singer and actor in male idol group Sexy Zone
Suehiro Maruo, Manga artist, one of the best-known exponents of Ero Guro (Originally from Nagasaki, Nagasaki)

References

External links 

Meguro City Official Website 

 
Wards of Tokyo